The Tasmanian Certificate of Education (TCE) is the main credential awarded to secondary school students who successfully complete senior high school level studies (years 11 and 12 or equivalent) in Tasmania, Australia. It was introduced in 1992 to replace Tasmania's old "High School Certificate", and partially restructured for 2007.

Patterns of Study
The majority of students undertake TASC-accredited courses over the final two years of school, however it is possible to undertake different study patterns over different time periods or through different teaching organisations. The last two year of high school have, for many years, been completed at Colleges (schools specialising in teaching years 11 and 12) or non-government schools. In 2017, the Minister for Education announced that all government schools would offer years 11 and 12 by 2022.

Courses
The Office of Tasmanian Assessment, Standards and Certification (TASC) accredits and assesses all eligible courses. TASC also assesses all students for their Tertiary Entrance Score (TES) and presents any awards earned.

The courses offered for study within the TCE are divided into categories according to the relevant knowledge types or skills. These reflect the nature of the subject and are similar to the way universities allocate areas of study according to faculty. These are: The Arts; English; Health and Physical Education; Humanities and Social Sciences; Languages; Mathematics; Science; Technologies; UTAS - High Achiever Program; and UTAS - University Connections Program.

The High Achiever Program (HAP) allows students who specialise in available subjects to take courses and units at the University of Tasmania (UTAS). These courses can provide credit to a UTAS degree and guarantees a place in the University. Some UTAS HAP units can contribute to a student's Australian Tertiary Admissions Rank. The admissions process for entry into the HAP is selective. 

The University Connections Program (UCP), formerly known as the University College Program, allows students to study university units as well as TASC courses. Unlike the HAP, the University Connections Program is accessible by any year 11 or 12 student. Some UCP units contribute to one's ATAR. Acceptance into the UCP costs; domestic students are covered by a scholarship and have their fee reduced. 

All available courses can be found on TASC's website.

Assessment
The Tasmanian Certificate of Education is awarded based upon a criterion based assessment. This basically means students can be assessed depending upon their meeting or successful completion of standards and criteria. These criteria usually assess knowledge, skills and competencies in differing ways to ensure a wide understanding of the course syllabus has been obtained by the student. It is felt that this is fair and more practical that just relying upon traditional examinations, although many areas of study still utilise exams in conjunction with other methods of assessment.

Subjects are offered at varying levels of difficulty, ranging from a basic understanding, through to a pre-tertiary entrance qualification. The difficulty of a subject is guided by its rating as a 1-3 level subject. Subjects are also given an A, B or C rating based on the number of hours that are required for the course, C being the longest. In this way, all subjects will have a rating such as 3A, or 2C etc., depending on the time it involves and the difficulty of the work involved.

C level subjects can also be offered as pre-tertiary (level 3C), and for students wishing to gain university entrance, enough points from pre-tertiary entrance subjects must be obtained to gain a Tertiary Entrance Rank (TER) score above the requirements for the applied course.

Award
Upon successful completion of a satisfactory pattern of study students are awarded the "Tasmanian Certificate of Education" (TCE) by way of a testamur. This may also come with a Tertiary Entrance Rank (TER) if the student has nominated to attempt a university entrance qualification, and the TER score will dictate which university courses the student is eligible to apply for.

See also
 List of schools in Tasmania
 University admission
 Victorian Certificate of Education
 Higher School Certificate

References

External links
 TCE at the Tasmanian Qualifications Authority page
The Office of Tasmanian Assessment, Standards and Certification (TASC) website

Education in Tasmania
School qualifications
School examinations
Australian Certificate of Education